Barbara Pálos-Bognár  (née Bognár)  (born 7 November 1987) is a Hungarian handballer for Moyra-Budaörs Handball as a playmaker.

Achievements
Nemzeti Bajnokság I:
Winner: 2005, 2006
Silver Medallist: 2004, 2007, 2010, 2011
Bronze Medallist: 2009
Magyar Kupa:
Winner: 2005, 2006, 2007
Silver Medallist: 2004, 2009, 2011
EHF Champions League:
Semifinalist: 2007
EHF Cup:
Finalist: 2004, 2005
EHF Cup Winners' Cup:
Finalist: 2006

References

External links
Barbara Bognár career statistics at Worldhandball

1987 births
Living people
Hungarian female handball players
Sportspeople from Győr
Expatriate handball players
Hungarian expatriate sportspeople in Denmark
Győri Audi ETO KC players
Viborg HK players